Sheree Julienne Wilson (born December 12, 1958) is an American actress, producer, businesswoman, and model. She is best known for her roles as April Stevens Ewing on the American primetime television series Dallas (1986–1991) and as Alex Cahill-Walker on the television series Walker, Texas Ranger (1993–2001).

Early life
Wilson was born in Rochester, Minnesota. The daughter of two IBM executives, Wilson moved to Colorado at the age of nine and graduated from Fairview High School. In 1981, she received a degree in fashion merchandising and business from the University of Colorado Boulder.

Career
While working in Denver on a fashion shoot, one of the photographers mistook Wilson for a model and then introduced her to a New York modeling agent who signed her on the spot. Wilson then moved to Manhattan, and within 18 months, she had appeared in over 30 commercial campaigns for Clairol, Sea Breeze, Keri-Lotion, and Maybelline. Her print work ran in such popular magazines as Mademoiselle, Glamour, and Redbook.

After three years of modeling, Wilson moved to Los Angeles for a career in acting. Her first roles included the black comedy film Crimewave (1984) directed by Sam Raimi, Velvet (1984), an ABC/Aaron Spelling television movie opposite Leah Ayres, Shari Belafonte, and Mary Margaret Humes, and a guest role on the espionage series Cover Up (1984). She had a lead role with Tim Robbins in the comedy motion picture Fraternity Vacation (1985) and also appeared in a CBS television miniseries Kane & Abel (1985) with Peter Strauss. This immediately led to Our Family Honor (1985-1986), an ABC drama about Irish cops versus the Mafia, in which she co-starred with Ray Liotta, Michael Madsen, and Eli Wallach. Her career continued to flourish with a role in the television movie News at Eleven (1986) alongside Martin Sheen.

Wilson gained the role as April Stevens Ewing on the CBS soap opera Dallas (1986–1991). Her character was gunned down in the final season during her honeymoon (with new husband Bobby Ewing) in Paris. She continued to make some appearances in Bobby's dream sequences later that season. In reality, Wilson was killed off and left the series due to maternity. Her performance earned her the Soap Opera Digest Award for Best Death Scene in 1991, as well as four other nominations. In 2006, she attended the TV Land Award ceremony for Dallas and in November 2008, the Dallas 30th anniversary reunion party at Southfork Ranch in Parker, Texas, with cast members Larry Hagman, Patrick Duffy, Linda Gray, Ken Kercheval, Steve Kanaly, and Charlene Tilton.

In 1993, following guest roles in the television series Matlock (opposite Clarence Gilyard's former acting mentor, Andy Griffith), Burke's Law (1994 TV series), and Renegade (opposite Lorenzo Lamas), Wilson played the lead female role in Hellbound opposite Chuck Norris, which led to her best-known role as Alexandra "Alex" Cahill-Walker also opposite Norris in Walker, Texas Ranger (1993-2001). In 2005 she reprised her role in the television movie Walker, Texas Ranger: Trial by Fire which ended with her character being the victim of a courthouse shooting. This left many viewers to believe that there would be a follow-up movie which was severely impaired when CBS said that they would no longer be producing "Sunday Night Movie of the Week" projects. She also co-starred in the Showtime movie Past Tense (1994).

In 2006, Wilson appeared in Fragile, the first short film by documentary filmmaker Fredric Lean. She played the lead role in television movies Mystery Woman: Game Time (2005) and Anna's Storm (2007). She produced and starred in independent films Killing Down (2006), The Gundown (2011), Easy Rider: The Ride Back (2012), and Dug Up (2013). She co-starred in the television series Pink (2007-2008) and had a guest role in the television series DeVanity (2014). She played a major role in the television movie Christmas Belle (2013), A Mermaid for Christmas (2019), and The Silent Natural (2019).

Wilson performed in the role of Miss Daisy Werthan in the Neil Simon Film Festival's Driving Miss Daisy (2016-2022) opposite her former Walker, Texas Ranger co-star, Clarence Gilyard.

Personal life
Wilson married Vince Morella in 2018 and currently resides in Dallas, Texas. She has two sons from a previous marriage to Paul DeRobbio (1991-2004).

Wilson has been active in the National Multiple Sclerosis Society, Trail of Tears Remembrance Motorcycle Ride, Wings for Life aimed at healing spinal cord injuries, and White Bridle Humane Society, a horse rescue equine therapy nonprofit organization for children with developmental disabilities located in Texas. Wilson also created a line of beauty therapy skin care products.

Filmography

Film

Television

Stage

Attraction

References

External links
 
 

1958 births
American film actresses
American soap opera actresses
American television actresses
Living people
People from Rochester, Minnesota
University of Colorado Boulder alumni
20th-century American actresses
21st-century American actresses
Actresses from Minnesota